Queen High Straight is the fourth solo album by former Transvision Vamp lead singer Wendy James. Released on 1 May 2020, it was written, produced and mixed by James.

Background 
The album took three years from inception, through writing stage, to the final masters for the 20 tracks that feature on the album. References and influences range from Sergio Mendes for the title track, Django Reinhardt for 'I'll Be Here When The Morning Comes', and Motown for 'Little Melvin' and 'Here Comes the Beautiful One' 

The album was released physically on CD, and as a double vinyl album. The album was also released as a digital download.

Track listing 
All songs by Wendy James

 "Queen High Straight [4.31]"
 "Perilous Beauty [4.08]"
 "Free Man Walk [3.39]"
 "Stomp Down, Snuck Up [4.14]"
 "Little Melvin [4.52]"
 "Marlene Et Fleur [4.00]"
 "A Heart Breaking Liar's Promise [5.11]"
 "Here Comes The Beautiful One [3.45]"
 "Chicken Street [4.13]"
 "Testimonial [4.18]"
 "Bar Room Brawl & Benzedrine Blues [4.07]"
 "Ratfucking [2.37]"
 "She Likes To Be [Underneath Somebody] [3.21]"
 "Bliss Hotel [4.00]"
 "Freak In [3.05]"
 "Little Melvin [4.52]"
 "The Impression Of Normalcy [3.36]"
 "I'll Be Here When The Morning Comes [4.15]"
 "Cancel It ... I'll See Him On Monday [3.37]"
 "Sugar Boy [4.00]"
 "Kill Some Time Blues [4.18]"

Personnel 

 Wendy James - vocals, rhythm guitar, keyboards, melodica
 James Sedwards – rhythm and lead guitar
 Harry Bohay – bass
 James Sclavunos – drums, percussion 
 Alex J Ward – alto saxophone
 Terry Edwards – trumpet, cornet, flugelhorn, tenor and baritone saxophone
 Louis Vause – accordion

References 

2020 albums
Wendy James albums
Indie rock albums by English artists